A statue of Harry S. Truman was installed in the U.S. Capitol, in Washington, D.C., on September 29, 2022, as part of the National Statuary Hall Collection. It replaced the statue of Thomas Hart Benton.

References

Harry S. Truman
Truman, Harry S.
Sculptures of men in Washington, D.C.